Trusthorpe is a small coastal village in the East Lindsey district of Lincolnshire, England. It forms part of the parish of Mablethorpe and Sutton . About  to the west is the hamlet of Thorpe.

The church is dedicated to Saint Peter and is Grade II listed, dating from the 14th century with alterations in 1522, 1606, 1842 and 1941. It is built of red brick with ashlar dressings, and the three stage tower has stepped corner buttresses. Just below the second stage is an ashlar datestone inscribed "1606 Anthone Swell." The nave dates from 1842 and the chancel from 1941; the font is 13th-century. At the east end of the nave is a wall monument to William Loft who died in 1854.

In 1964 a community facility, St Peter's Community Annexe, was built to provide local information and events. In 2014 the Annexe received a National Lottery grant for renovation works. 

Trusthorpe C of E School was built in 1856 in memory of William Loft, as a National School. It closed on 21 December 1927.

Trusthorpe windmill was originally erected at Newland, near Hull. Mr Charles Foster bought it and moved it to Trusthorpe where it was incorporated into a new mill. The post mill was demolished and replaced in 1901 when a new tower mill was built; this lasted until 1935 after which it was converted into a house.

References

External links

 Photo gallery for Mablethorpe, Trusthorpe, Sutton-On-Sea with images old and new
 Dedicated site of St. Peter's Church Annexe Trusthorpe

Populated coastal places in Lincolnshire
Villages in Lincolnshire
East Lindsey District